Morton station, also known as Morton–Rutledge station, is a SEPTA Regional Rail station in Morton, Pennsylvania. Located at Yale and Morton Avenues, it serves the Media/Wawa Line. While the south, inbound platform of the station is in Morton Borough, the north, outbound side is in Springfield Township. Both dollar-a-day and permit parking are available. In 2013, this station saw 720 boardings and 657 alightings on an average weekday.

History
Morton Station was originally built in 1867 for the West Chester and Philadelphia Railroad. It was rebuilt in 1880 by architect Joseph Wilson of the Wilson Brothers architectural firm (although some have mistakenly credited the building to Frank Furness) for the Pennsylvania Railroad. The second station is believed to have been designed in a manner similar to that of Glen Mills, which is now owned by the West Chester Railroad. In 1892, PRR added a westbound passenger shelter. A former freight house built in 1879 exists 50 feet west of the station house, both of which are maintained by the Morton Station Preservation Committee.

On May 28, 2009, SEPTA approved a $2.6 million rehabilitation effort for Morton station.

Station layout
Morton has two low-level side platforms.

References

External links

Morton Station | SEPTA
Station from Woodland Avenue/Morton Avenue from Google Maps Street View

SEPTA Regional Rail stations
Stations on the West Chester Line
Former Pennsylvania Railroad stations
1867 establishments in Pennsylvania
Railway stations in the United States opened in 1867